Doppia coppia con Regina (Spanish title: Alta tensión) is a 1972 Spanish-Italian film directed by Julio Buchs. It stars Marisa Mell and Gabriele Ferzetti.

Cast
 Marisa Mell as Laura Moncada
 Gabriele Ferzetti	 as Pablo Moncada
 Juan Luis Galiardo as José
 Helga Liné as Choni
 Patrizia Adiutori as Elisa Folbert
 Eduardo Calvo	as Il cieco

References

External links

1972 films
Italian crime thriller films
1970s Italian-language films
Films scored by Gianni Ferrio
1970s Italian films
Spanish crime thriller films
1970s Spanish-language films
Spanish multilingual films
Italian multilingual films